The Manchu alphabet is the alphabet used to write the now nearly-extinct Manchu language. A similar script is used today by the Xibe people, who speak a language considered either as a dialect of Manchu or a closely related, mutually intelligible language. It is written vertically from top to bottom, with columns proceeding from left to right.

History

Tongki fuka akū hergen 
He decried the fact that while illiterate Han Chinese and Mongolians could understand their respective languages when read aloud, that was not the case for the Manchus, whose documents were recorded by Mongolian scribes. Overriding the objections of two advisors named Erdeni and G'ag'ai, he is credited with adapting the Mongolian script to Manchu. The resulting script was known as  — the "script without dots and circles".

Tongki fuka sindaha hergen 
In 1632, Dahai added diacritical marks to clear up a lot of the ambiguity present in the original Mongolian script; for instance, a leading k, g, and h are distinguished by the placement of no diacritical mark, a dot, and a circle, respectively. This revision created the standard script, known as  — the "script with dots and circles". As a result, the Manchu alphabet contains little ambiguity. Recently discovered manuscripts from the 1620s make clear, however, that the addition of dots and circles to Manchu script began before their supposed introduction by Dahai.

Dahai also added the tulergi hergen ("foreign/outer letters"): ten graphemes to facilitate Manchu to be used to write Chinese, Sanskrit, and Tibetan loanwords. Previously, these non-Manchu sounds did not have corresponding letters in Manchu.
Sounds that were transliterated included the aspirated sounds k' (Chinese pinyin: k), k (g), x (h); ts' (c); ts (ci); sy (si); dz (z); c'y (chi); j'y (zhi); and ž (r).

19th century – present 
By the middle of the nineteenth century, there were three styles of writing Manchu in use: standard script (ginggulere hergen), semi-cursive script (gidara hergen), and cursive script (lasihire hergen). Semicursive script had less spacing between the letters, and cursive script had rounded tails.

The Manchu alphabet was also used to write Chinese. A modern example is in Manchu: a Textbook for Reading Documents, which has a comparative table of romanizations of Chinese syllables written in Manchu letters, Hànyǔ Pīnyīn and Wade–Giles. Using the Manchu script to transliterate Chinese words is a source of loanwords for the Xibe language. Several Chinese-Manchu dictionaries contain Chinese characters transliterated with Manchu script. The Manchu versions of the Thousand Character Classic and Dream of the Red Chamber are actually the Manchu transcription of all the Chinese characters.

In the Imperial Liao-Jin-Yuan Three Histories National Language Explanation commissioned by the Qianlong Emperor, the Manchu alphabet is used to write Evenki (Solon) words. In the Pentaglot Dictionary, also commissioned by the Qianlong Emperor, the Manchu alphabet is used to transcribe Tibetan and Chagatai (related to Uyghur) words.

Alphabet

Method of teaching 
Despite its alphabetic nature, the Manchu "alphabet" was traditionally taught as a syllabary to reflect its phonotactics. Manchu children were taught to memorize the shapes of all the syllables in the language separately as they learned to write and say right away "la, lo", etc., instead of saying "l, a — la"; "l, o — lo"; etc. As a result, the syllables contained in their syllabary do not contain all possible combinations that can be formed with their letters. They made, for instance, no such use of the consonants l, m, n and r as English; hence if the Manchu letters s, m, a, r and t were joined in that order, a Manchu would not pronounce them as "smart".

Today, it is still divided among experts on whether the Manchu script is alphabetic or syllabic. In China, it is considered syllabic, and Manchu is still taught in this manner, while in the West it is treated like an alphabet.  The alphabetic approach is used mainly by foreigners who want to learn the language, as studying the Manchu script as a syllabary takes longer.

Twelve uju 
The syllables in Manchu are divided into twelve categories called uju (literally "head") based on their syllabic codas (final phonemes). Here lists the names of the twelve uju in their traditional order:a, ai, ar, an, ang, ak, as, at, ab, ao, al, am.Each uju contains syllables ending in the coda of its name. Hence, Manchu only allows nine final consonants for its closed syllables, otherwise a syllable is open with a monophthong (a uju) or a diphthong (ai uju and ao uju).The syllables in an uju are further sorted and grouped into three or two according to their similarities in pronunciation and shape. For example, a uju arranges its 131 licit syllables in the following order:a, e, i; o, u, ū; na, ne, ni; no, nu, nū;

ka, ga, ha; ko, go, ho; kū, gū, hū;

ba, be, bi; bo, bu, bū; pa, pe, pi; po, pu, pū;

sa, se, si; so, su, sū; ša, še, ši; šo, šu, šū;

ta, da; te, de; ti, di; to, do; tu, du;

la, le, li; lo, lu, lū; ma, me, mi; mo, mu, mū;

ca, ce, ci; co, cu, cū; ja, je, ji; jo, ju, jū; ya, ye; yo, yu, yū;

ke, ge, he; ki, gi, hi; ku, gu, hu; k'a, g'a, h'a; k'o, g'o, h'o;

ra, re, ri; ro, ru, rū;

fa, fe, fi; fo, fu, fū; wa, we;

ts'a, ts'e, ts; ts'o, ts'u; dza, dze, dzi, dzo, dzu;

ža, že, ži; žo, žu; sy, c'y, jy.In general, while syllables in the same row resemble each other phonetically and visually, syllables in the same group (as the semicolons separate) bear greater similarities.

Punctuation 

The Manchu alphabet has two kinds of punctuation: two dots, analogous to a period; and one dot, analogous to a comma. However, with the exception of lists of nouns being reliably punctuated by single dots, punctuation in Manchu is inconsistent, and therefore not of much use as an aid to readability.

The equivalent of the question mark in Manchu script consists of some special particles, written at the end of the question.

Jurchen script 
The Jurchens of a millennium ago became the ancestors of the Manchus when Nurhaci united the Jianzhou Jurchens (1593–1618) and his son subsequently renamed the consolidated tribes as the "Manchu". Throughout this period, the Jurchen language evolved into what we know as the Manchu language. Its script has no relation to the Manchu alphabet, however. The Jurchen script was instead derived from the Khitan script, itself derived from Chinese characters.

Unicode 
The Manchu alphabet is included in the Unicode block for Mongolian.

See also 
 Mongolian script
 Transliterations of Manchu
Clear Script

References

Further reading

External links 

 Abkai — Unicode Manchu/Sibe/Daur Fonts and Keyboards
 Manchu alphabet
 Manchu script generator (Romanization → Manchu script (also for download))
 ManchuFont — an OpenType font for Manchu writing
 Jurchen Script

Alphabets
Alphabet
1599 introductions
Letters with final form